Herbert Dickinson Ward (June 29, 1861 – June 27, 1932) was an American author, born at Waltham, Massachusetts, son of William Hayes Ward.  Graduating from Phillips Academy, Andover, in 1880 and Amherst College in 1884, he wrote extensively for newspapers and periodicals. Ward married Elizabeth Stuart Phelps on October 20, 1888.

Works
 The New Senior at Andover (1890)
 A Republic without a President, and Other Stories (1891)
 The Captain of the Kittiewink (1892)
 A Dash to the Pole (1893)
 The White Crown, and Other Stories (1894)
The Silent Witness (1896)
 The Burglar Who Moved Paradise (1897)
 The Light of the World (1901)
 
Co-authored with his wife Elizabeth Stuart Phelps Ward
A Lost Hero (1889)
The Master of the Magicians (1890)
Come Forth (1891)

References

External links
 
 

1861 births
1932 deaths
19th-century American novelists
20th-century American novelists
American male novelists
Amherst College alumni
People from Waltham, Massachusetts
19th-century American male writers
20th-century American male writers